Collagen alpha-1(XVIII) chain is a protein that in humans is encoded by the COL18A1 gene.

This gene encodes the alpha chain of type XVIII collagen. This collagen is one of the multiplexins, extracellular matrix proteins that contain multiple triple-helix domains (collagenous domains) interrupted by non-collagenous domains. The proteolytically produced C-terminal fragment of type XVIII collagen is endostatin, a potent antiangiogenic protein. Mutations in this gene are associated with Knobloch syndrome. The main features of this syndrome involve retinal abnormalities so type XVIII collagen may play an important role in retinal structure and in neural tube closure. Two transcript variants encoding different isoforms have been found for this gene.

See also
Collagen

References

Further reading

External links 
 
 

Collagens